The mullein moth (Cucullia verbasci) is a noctuid moth with a Palearctic distribution. The species was first described by Carl Linnaeus in his landmark 1758 10th edition of Systema Naturae.

Description

The forewing is broad (for the genus) and brownish ochreous; the costal streak and those preceding and following the lower part of outer line are a deep red brown; the lunules following the line are white and conspicuous; the space below median paler, becoming almost whitish above the outer dark brown streak; the stigmata are marked by dark brown spots; a row of deep brown streaks from apex to vein 6, and another, more faint, from below the apex to the end of cell. The hindwing of the male is whitish, with dark veins and cellspot, becoming diffusely fuscous along the termen; in the female it is darker throughout.

The larva is creamy with black and yellow spots.

Similar species
Cucullia verbasci is difficult to certainly distinguish from these congeners.

Shargacucullia scrophulariae (Denis & Schiffermüller, 1775) 
Shargacucullia lychnitis (Rambur, 1833)

Range 
It is found in western, southern and central Europe and North Africa. However, there are only individual finds from Denmark and southern Estonia in the north. The eastern presence extends to western Afghanistan. It is also found in Israel and Turkey.

Status 
The Mullein moth mainly occupies dry and warm places, such as scrublands, dry grasslands, on rocky slopes, and on steppes, as well as parks and gardens.

The moth's caterpillar completely strips the leaves of the host plant and can be a horticultural pest. When threatened, the caterpillar freezes and may vomit.

Life cycle

Egg 
Eggs are laid singly on the under-surface of leaves of food plants. Initially white, they turn grey before hatching.

Larva 

The larva is the most commonly encountered part of the life cycle, clearly visible as it feeds on the leaves of its host plants.

Pupa
The pupa is the longest part of the life cycle (up to five years in captivity). It lives underground in a strong cocoon.

Imago
They also show minor variation in colour. The moth flies from late April to June depending on the location.

Host plants
Buddleja – Buddleia, butterfly bush
Himantoglossum hircinum – lizard orchid
Scrophularia – figworts
Verbascum – mulleins

References

Bibliography

External links

Fauna Europaea
Royal Horticultural Society advice on Mullein Moth pest control.
English Nature page on Mullein Moth
Lepiforum e. V.

Cucullia
Moths described in 1758
Insect pests of ornamental plants
Moths of Africa
Moths of Asia
Moths of Europe
Moths of the Middle East
Taxa named by Carl Linnaeus
Palearctic Lepidoptera